Mount Kidd is a  double-summit massif centrally located in Kananaskis Country in the Canadian Rockies of Alberta, Canada. Mount Kidd is situated within Spray Valley Provincial Park, and its nearest higher neighbor is Mount Sparrowhawk,  to the northwest. Mount Kidd is a landmark that can be seen from Highway 40 in the Kananaskis Village area, and from the Kananaskis Country Golf Course which lies at the eastern base of the mountain.

History

In 1907, Dr. Donaldson Bogart Dowling, an engineer with the Geological Survey of Canada, named the mountain for John Alfred (Fred) Kidd, who was a resident of nearby Morley, Alberta. From 1902 to 1907, Kidd ran the Morley general store and outfitted expeditions and geological survey crews such as Dowling's with supplies. The first ascent of the mountain was made in 1947 by R. C. Hind and J. F. Tarrant. The mountain's name was officially adopted in 1953 by the Geographical Names Board of Canada. In June 1986, Mount Kidd was the scene of the first of three related airplane crashes known as the Rescue 807 Crashes. In August 2010, James Hoshizaki stepped onto a snow cornice to pose for a photo when it gave way, resulting in an avalanche that swept him down about 200 metres to his death.

Geology
Mount Kidd is composed of sedimentary rock laid down during the Precambrian to Jurassic periods. Formed in shallow seas, this sedimentary rock was pushed east and over the top of younger rock during the Laramide orogeny. The Lewis Overthrust extends over 450 km (280 mi) from Mount Kidd south to Steamboat Mountain, located west of Great Falls, Montana. Mount Kidd marks the northern end of the Lewis Thrust Fault.

Climate
Based on the Köppen climate classification, Mount Kidd is located in a subarctic climate zone with cold snowy winters and mild summers. Weather conditions during winter make Mount Kidd one of the better places in the Rockies for ice climbing. Precipitation runoff from the mountain drains into the Kananaskis River which is a tributary of the Bow River, and thence the Saskatchewan River.

Climbing

Mount Kidd has two summits, a north and south peak, each with scramble routes. The more massive north peak is the true summit at 2,958 metres (9,705 ft), whereas the lesser south peak rises to 2,895 metres (9,498 ft). Additionally, Mount Kidd has a class 5.7 rock climbing route on its northeast buttress, as well a 5.8 route called The Fold on the south peak. In 1985, Rudi Kranabitter and Ferdl Taxbock made the first ascent of this now-classic route.

Ice Climbing Routes with grades on Mount Kidd:

 A Bridge Too Far – WI4+
 Kidd Falls – WI4
 Tasting Fear – WI5−
 Wedge Smear – WI3
 Sinatra Falls – WI2

Gallery

See also

Scrambles in the Canadian Rockies
List of mountains of Canada
Geography of Alberta

References

External links

 Mount Kidd weather web site: Mountain Forecast
 Drone video at Mount Kidd: YouTube
 Mt. Kidd reflection photo: Flickr

Kidd
Kidd
Kidd